Symphyotrichum undulatum (formerly Aster undulatus) is a species of flowering plant in the family Asteraceae native to eastern North America.

Description
The roots can have short rhizomes or branched and woody caudices.

Its flowers have blue to purple, or sometimes lilac, ray florets and cream or light yellow, then purple, disk florets.

Fruit 
The fruits (seeds) of Symphyotrichum undulatum are not true achenes but are cypselae, resembling an achene but surrounded by a calyx sheath. This is true for all members of the Asteraceae family. After pollination, they become 
dull purple to light brown or tan with an oblong-obovoid compressed shape,  in length with  nerves, and with a few stiff, slender bristles on the surface (strigillose).

Chromosomes
The species has a monoploid number (also called base number) of eight chromosomes  Individual plants with 16 and 32 sets of its chromosomes have been found, meaning the species is diploid and tetraploid.

Conservation
, NatureServe listed  as Secure (G5) globally; Secure (S5) in New Jersey, New York, North Carolina, and West Virginia; Apparently Secure (S4) in Virginia; Vulnerable (S3) in Indiana and Nova Scotia; and, Critically Imperiled (S1) in Illinois. The species' global status was last reviewed on 25 July 2016.

Notes

Citations

References

undulatum
Flora of Eastern North America
Plants described in 1753
Taxa named by Carl Linnaeus